Alden Stephen Rochè Jr. (April 9, 1945 – May 29, 2022) was an American professional football player who was a defensive end for nine seasons in the National Football League (NFL).  He played for the Denver Broncos, Green Bay Packers, and Seattle Seahawks from 1970 to 1978, having earlier played college football at Southern University.

Early life
Roche was born in New Orleans on April 9, 1945.  He attended Xavier University Preparatory School in his hometown.  He then studied at Southern University, where he played college football for the Southern Jaguars.  He received first-team All-American honors and was selected as an All-SWAC defensive end.  He was also named the university's most valuable defensive lineman in 1969.  Roche was drafted by the Denver Broncos in the second round (37th overall selection) of the 1970 NFL Draft.

Career
Roche made his NFL debut with the Broncos on September 20, 1970, at the age of 25, in a 25–10 win over the Buffalo Bills.  He played in all 14 games during his rookie season, before being traded to the Green Bay Packers for Don Horn on January 28 the following year.  The transaction also included a swap of 1971 first-round picks, with the Packers selecting John Brockington at 9th and the Broncos choosing Marv Montgomery at 12th.

The Packers appointed Dan Devine as head coach six games into the 1971 season.  He chose Roche as the starting right defensive end, replacing the incumbent Lionel Aldridge, a holdover from the Packers' glory days under Vince Lombardi.  Roche was noted for his versatility – filling in for Mike McCoy at left defensive tackle and Clarence Williams at left defensive end – and won the Packers most valuable player award for defense that year.  He went on to hold the starting role for the next five seasons, playing in all but one game during his tenure with the franchise.  He played an integral role in helping the Packers finish second in the league in team defense during the 1972 season, when the team won what was ultimately their only division title between 1967 and 1995.  He also tied with McCoy for the franchise lead in sacks (8.5) in 1976.  Roche formed a noted defensive partnership with Williams.

Roche joined the Seattle Seahawks in 1977.  He spent his last two years in the NFL with the franchise before retiring after the 1978 season.

Personal life
Roche was inducted into the Greater New Orleans Sports Hall of Fame in 1991.  His grandson, Jay'Shawn Washington, played college football for the Southern Miss Golden Eagles from 2015 to 2018.

Roche died on May 29, 2022 in Marrero, Louisiana at the age of 77.

References

1945 births
2022 deaths
People from Marrero, Louisiana
Players of American football from New Orleans 
American football defensive linemen
Southern Jaguars football players
Green Bay Packers players
Seattle Seahawks players